The Trinity–Wesleyan football rivalry is an American college football rivalry between the Trinity Bantams of Trinity College and the Wesleyan Cardinals of Wesleyan University.

Game results

See also  
 List of NCAA college football rivalry games

References

College football rivalries in the United States
Trinity Bantams football
Wesleyan Cardinals football
1885 establishments in Connecticut
American football in Connecticut